"Goodbye" is a song by American R&B singer Tevin Campbell. It was written and produced by Al B. Sure! and Kyle West for his debut studio album T.E.V.I.N. (1991). In February 1992, the song was released as the album's fourth single. It fared fairly well on the US R&B charts climbing to number two but not as much success on the pop charts, peaking at number 85 on the Billboard Hot 100.

Music video
The music video for "Goodbye" features guest appearances by Tatyana Ali and Tyler Collins.

Track listings

Notes
 denotes additional producer
 denotes additional co-producer

Charts

In popular culture
The song is referenced by Inspectah Deck in the Wu-Tang Clan song  "Protect Ya Neck" with the line "The vandal, too hot to handle / you battle, you're saying Goodbye like Tevin Campbell".

References

Tevin Campbell songs
1992 singles
1991 songs
Warner Records singles
Songs written by Al B. Sure!
Songs written by Kyle West